Premna is a genus of flowering plants in the mint family, Lamiaceae, first described for modern science in 1771. It is widespread through tropical and subtropical regions in Africa, southern Asia, northern Australia, and various islands in the Pacific and Indian Oceans.

Species
 Premna acuminata R.Br. - Australia, New Guinea
 Premna acutata W.W.Sm. - southwestern China (Yunnan, Sichuan)
 Premna alba H.J.Lam - Palau
 Premna ambongensis Moldenke - Madagascar
 Premna amplectens Wall. ex Schauer  - Thailand, Myanmar
 Premna angolensis Gürke - tropical Africa
 Premna angustiflora H.J.Lam - Palau
 Premna annulata H.R.Fletcher - Thailand, Laos, Vietnam
 Premna aureolepidota Moldenke - Madagascar
 Premna balakrishnanii A.Rajendran & P.Daniel - Tamil Nadu
 Premna balansae Dop - Vietnam
 Premna barbata Wall. ex Schauer - Indian Subcontinent, Myanmar
 Premna bengalensis C.B.Clarke - Indian Subcontinent, Myanmar, Vietnam
 Premna bequaertii Moldenke - Uganda, Rwanda, Zaïre
 Premna bracteata Wall. ex C.B.Clarke - Himalayas, Tibet, Yunnan, Nepal, Assam, Bhutan, Myanmar
 Premna cambodiana Dop - Cambodia, Vietnam
 Premna cavaleriei H.Lév - China (Guangdong, Guangxi, Guizhou, Hunan, Jiangxi)
 Premna chevalieri Dop - Thailand, Laos, Vietnam, China (Hainan, Yunnan)
 Premna chrysoclada (Bojer) Gürke - Kenya, Tanzania, Guinea-Bissau
 Premna collinsae Craib - Thailand
 Premna confinis C.Pei & S.L.Chen ex C.Y.Wu - China (Guangxi, Yunnan)
 Premna congolensis Moldenke - Zaïre, Angola, Cabinda
 Premna cordifolia Roxb. - Thailand, Vietnam, Malaya
 Premna coriacea C.B.Clarke - Indian Subcontinent, Thailand, Andaman Islands
 Premna corymbosa Rottler - India, Sri Lanka, Andaman & Nicobar Islands
 Premna crassa Hand.-Mazz. - Vietnam, China (Guangxi, Guizhou, Yunnan)
 Premna debiana A.Rajendran & P.Daniel - Arunachal Pradesh
 Premna decaryi Moldenke - Madagascar
 Premna decurrens H.J.Lam - Indonesia
 Premna discolor Verdc. - Kenya
 Premna dubia Craib - Laos, Thailand, Vietnam
 Premna esculenta Roxb. - Assam, Bangladesh, Myanmar, Thailand
 Premna fohaiensis C.Pei & S.L.Chen ex C.Y.Wu - China (Yunnan)
 Premna fordii Dunn - China (Guangdong, Guangxi, Hainan)
 Premna fulva Craib - Indochina, Indonesia, China (Guangxi, Guizhou, Yunnan)
 Premna garrettii H.R.Fletcher - Thailand
 Premna glaberrima Wight - southern India
 Premna glandulosa Hand.-Mazz. - China (Yunnan)
 Premna gracillima Verdc. - Kenya, Tanzania
 Premna grandifolia A.D.J. Meeuse, illegitimate name, = Premna hutchinsonii 
 Premna grossa Wall. ex Schauer - Myanmar
 Premna guillauminii Moldenke - New Caledonia
 Premna hainanensis Chun & F.C.How - China (Hainan)
 Premna hans-joachimii Verdc. - Tanzania
 Premna henryana (Hand.-Mazz.) C.Y.Wu - China (Sichuan, Yunnan)
 Premna herbacea Roxb. - Himalayas, Yunnan, Indian Subcontinent, Southeast Asia, Indonesia, New Guinea, northern Australia
 Premna hildebrandtii Gürke - Zaire, Kenya, Tanzania, Mozambique, Zimbabwe
 Premna hispida Benth. - West Africa
 Premna humbertii Moldenke - Madagascar
 Premna hutchinsonii Moldenke - Ivory Coast
 Premna interrupta Wall. ex Schauer - southern China, Himalayas, Indochina
 Premna jalpaiguriana T.K.Paul - West Bengal
 Premna khasiana C.B.Clarke - Assam, Thailand
 Premna lepidella Moldenke - Madagascar
 Premna ligustroides Hemsl - China (Guizhou, Hubei, Jiangxi, Sichuan)
 Premna longiacuminata Moldenke - Madagascar
 Premna longifolia Roxb. - Himalayas
 Premna longipetiolata Moldenke - Madagascar
 Premna lucens A.Chev. - West Africa
 Premna macrophylla Wall. ex Schauer - Assam, Indochina
 Premna madagascariensis Moldenke - Madagascar
 Premna mariannarum Schauer - Mariana Islands
 Premna matadiensis Moldenke - Zaïre, Angola
 Premna maxima T.C.E. Fr. - Kenya
 Premna mekongensis W.W.Sm. - China (Yunnan)
 Premna micrantha Schauer - India, Assam, Bangladesh
 Premna microphylla Turcz. - Japan, Ryukyu Islands, China (Anhui, Fujian, Guangdong, Guangxi, Guizhou, Hainan, Henan, Hubei, Hunan, Jiangxi, Sichuan, Taiwan, Yunnan, Zhejiang)
 Premna milleflora C.B.Clarke - Assam
 Premna milnei Baker - Nigeria, Bioko
 Premna minor Domin - Queensland
 Premna mollissima Roth - Indian Subcontinent, Yunnan, Indochina, Philippines
 Premna mooiensis (H.Pearson) W.Piep - Mozambique, Eswatini, South Africa
 Premna mortehanii De Wild - Zaïre
 Premna mundanthuraiensis A.Rajendran & P.Daniel - Tamil Nadu
 Premna neurophylla Chiov. - Ethiopia
 Premna oblongata Miq. - Indonesia, Philippines
 Premna odorata Blanco - - Indian Subcontinent, Yunnan, Southeast Asia, New Guinea, northern Australia; naturalized in Miami-Dade County in Florida
 Premna oligantha C.Y.Wu - China (Sichuan, Tibet, Yunnan)
 Premna oligotricha Baker - Ethiopia, Somalia, Kenya, Tanzania
 Premna orangeana Capuron - Madagascar
 Premna paisehensis C.Pei & S.L.Chen - China (Guangxi)
 Premna pallescens Ridl.- Borneo, Indonesia
 Premna parasitica Blume - Indonesia
 Premna parvilimba C.Pei - China (Yunnan)
 Premna paucinervis (C.B.Clarke) Gamble - Kerala, Tamil Nadu
 Premna paulobarbata H.J.Lam - Mariana Islands
 Premna perplexans Moldenke - Madagascar
 Premna perrieri Moldenke - Madagascar
 Premna pinguis C.B.Clarke - Assam, Bangladesh, Myanmar, Java
 Premna polita Hiern - Angola
 Premna procumbens Moon - India, Bangladesh, Sri Lanka
 Premna protrusa A.C.Sm. & S.Darwin - Fiji
 Premna puberula Pamp. - China (Fujian, Gansu, Guangdong, Guangxi, Guizhou, Hubei, Hunan, Shanxi, Sichuan, Yunnan)
 Premna pubescens Blume - Indonesia, Philippines, Christmas Island
 Premna puerensis Y.Y.Qian - China (Yunnan)
 Premna punduana Wall. ex Schauer - Arunachal Pradesh, Assam, Bangladesh
 Premna punicea C.Y.Wu - China (Yunnan)
 Premna purpurascens Thwaites - Sri Lanka
 Premna quadrifolia Schumach. & Thonn. - West Africa
 Premna rabakensis Moldenke - Cambodia
 Premna regularis H.J.Lam - Philippines, Indonesia, New Guinea
 Premna repens H.R.Fletcher - Thailand
 Premna resinosa (Hochst.) Schauer - East Africa, Arabian Peninsula, India
 Premna richardsiae Moldenke - Tanzania
 Premna rubroglandulosa C.Y.Wu - China (Yunnan)
 Premna scandens Roxb. - China (Yunnan), Himalayas, Andaman Island, Indochina
 Premna schimperi Engl - East Africa
 Premna schliebenii Werderm. - Tanzania, Mozambique
 Premna scoriarum W.W.Sm. - Tibet, Yunnan, Myanmar
 Premna senensis Klotzsch  - eastern + central Africa
 Premna serrata H.R.Fletcher - Thailand
 Premna serratifolia L. - widespread in East Africa, the Indian Subcontinent, Southeast Asia, northern Australia, islands of Pacific + Indian Oceans
 Premna siamensis H.R.Fletcher - Thailand
 Premna stenobotrys Merr. - Vietnam
 Premna steppicola Hand.-Mazz. - China (Sichuan, Yunnan)
 †Premna sterculiifolia King & Gamble - Malaya but extinct
 Premna straminicaulis C.Y.Wu - China (Yunnan)
 Premna subcapitata Rehder - China (Sichuan, Yunnan)
 Premna sulphurea (Baker) Gürke - Angola
 Premna sunyiensis C.Pei - China (Guangdong)
 Premna szemaoensis Pei - China (Yunnan)
 Premna tahitensis J.Schauer - many islands of the Pacific
 Premna tanganyikensis Moldenke - Tanzania, Mozambique
 Premna tapintzeana Dop - China (Yunnan)
 Premna tenii C.Pei - China (Yunnan)
 Premna thorelii Dop - Laos
 Premna thwaitesii C.B.Clarke  - Sri Lanka
 Premna tomentosa Willd. - Indian Subcontinent, Southeast Asia, Queensland, Solomon Islands
 Premna trichostoma Miq. - Southeast Asia, Indonesia, New Guinea
 Premna urticifolia Rehder - China (Yunnan)
 Premna velutina Gürke - Burundi, Kenya, Tanzania, Mozambique
 Premna venulosa Moldenke - Madagascar
 Premna wightiana Schauer - India, Sri Lanka
 Premna wui Boufford & B.M.Barthol. - China (Yunnan)
 Premna yunnanensis W.W.Sm - China (Sichuan, Yunnan)

References

 
Lamiaceae genera
Taxa named by Carl Linnaeus
Taxonomy articles created by Polbot